Nintendo New York (previously known as Nintendo World and The Pokémon Center) is the flagship specialty store of video game corporation Nintendo. Located in 10 Rockefeller Plaza, at Rockefeller Center in New York City, the two-story,  store opened on May 14, 2005.

The store sells a wide variety of Nintendo video games and merchandise, including apparel, hardware, and accessories that are exclusive to the store, such as Japanese Mario character plushies, and special guides to a wide variety of Nintendo games. The store includes a dedicated Pokémon section.

On the second level of the store, there are kiosks with various Nintendo Switch games running, allowing anyone to play. The second story also serves as a museum featuring past Nintendo game systems and peripherals. Notable items include the Power Glove, an original Nintendo Entertainment System, a Nintendo Famicom from Japan, and a still-working Game Boy that was damaged in a bombing during the Gulf War. Nintendo New York regularly holds tournaments and shows for new games, giving early releases and prizes to winners.  In addition, they have held screenings for multiple official Nintendo broadcasts, most commonly Nintendo's annual main E3 presentation.

History 
The space was formerly called The Pokémon Center, which opened on November 16, 2001.  It ran until January 2005, when it closed for remodeling, reopening as the Nintendo World store 4 months later.

On September 25, 2005, developer Shigeru Miyamoto visited the Nintendo World store to commemorate the release of Nintendogs and the 20th anniversary of Super Mario Bros.

On July 10, 2010, Dragon Quest creator Yuji Horii visited the Nintendo World store to commemorate the release of Dragon Quest IX: Sentinels of the Starry Skies.

On November 1, 2010, the Nintendo World store re-opened after a three-week makeover that included various upgrades, including the addition of new Nintendo DSi systems, adjusted lighting, and an expanded museum area. Part of the makeover included getting ready for the 25th anniversary celebration  of Super Mario Bros. on November 7, 2010. Guests to the celebration included Nintendo of America President Reggie Fils-Aimé and Shigeru Miyamoto.

On November 17, 2012, the Nintendo World store had a big launch event for the Wii U, with hundreds of people in attendance. Reggie Fils-Aimé (who grew up in the NY area) made an appearance at the event.

From November 21, 2014 until January 15, 2015, anyone with a copy of Pokémon Omega Ruby or Alpha Sapphire could receive an Eon ticket for their individual game to have an in-game encounter with Latias or Latios, depending on their version of the game. Once the Eon ticket had been obtained, it could be passed on to other players with a copy of the game for free via StreetPass.

On January 19, 2016, the Nintendo World store was closed for renovation and re-opened its doors on February 19, 2016, with new features in the store. On its re-opening, the store was renamed "Nintendo New York."

On March 14, 2020, Nintendo NY shortened their hours open to the public. Two days later, on March 16, 2020, they announced on Twitter that they would be officially on full closure due to the COVID-19 pandemic in New York City. On August 5, 2020, Nintendo NY announced they would be reopening the store on August 8. However, visitors must follow the correct guidelines during the pandemic and if they want to enter the store they must book a reservation online.

On June 1, 2020, the store's windows were vandalized during a riot in wake of the George Floyd protests.

Sister locations
On November 22, 2019, Nintendo opened their first sister location in Japan called Nintendo Tokyo. The new flagship store is located inside a newly constructed building named Shibuya Parco. The Pokémon Company later announced a new Pokémon Center store opening adjacent to Nintendo Tokyo in late November 2019,  the same day as Shibuya Parco's opening date. Nintendo announced on November 5, 2021 that they would open another sister location in Japan called Nintendo Osaka, by the end of 2022. It opened in November 2022. It is located on the thirteenth floor of the Daimaru Umeda department store in Kita-ku, as a store-within-a-store.

The Nintendo of America headquarters in Redmond, Washington has a private store for employees.

Licensed
In May 2012, Shas Samurai, Nintendo's official representative in Saudi Arabia, opened a "Nintendo World Store" at Al Faisaliah Mall in Riyadh. In June 2019, Nintendo's official Israeli distributor TorGaming Ltd. launched a licensed Nintendo retail store at Dizengoff Center in Tel Aviv. The store was Dizengoff Center's second largest launch. In March 2020, a store dedicated to the Nintendo Switch called "NSEW" has opened in Hong Kong in cooperation with Nintendo.

References

External links 

 
 
 

2005 establishments in New York City
Commercial buildings in Manhattan
Nintendo
Rockefeller Center
Shops in New York City
Video game retailers of the United States